Hendrik van Heuraet (1633, Haarlem - 1660?, Leiden) was a Dutch mathematician also known as Henrici van Heuraet. He is noted as one of the founders of the integral, and author of Epistola de Transmutatione Curvarum Linearum in Rectus [On the Transformation of Curves into Straight Lines] (1659). From 1653 he studied at Leiden University where he  interacted with Frans van Schooten, Johannes Hudde, and Christiaan Huygens. In 1658 he and Hudde left for Saumur in France. He returned to Leiden the next year as a physician. After this his trail is lost.

Bibliography

References

External links
 Geometria, à Renato Des Cartes Anno 1637 (1683) with Epistola de Transmutatione Curvarum Linearum in Rectus, p. 517, @GoogleBooks.
 Hendrik van Heuraet  at Turnbull WWW server
 Text with slightly more info on his life (Dutch)

1634 births
1660s deaths
17th-century Dutch mathematicians
People from Haarlem
Leiden University alumni